Hydrophobic sand (or magic sand) is a toy made from sand coated with a hydrophobic compound. The presence of the hydrophobic compound causes the grains of sand to adhere to one another and form cylinders (to minimize surface area) when exposed to water, and form a pocket of air around the sand.  The pocket of air makes magic sand unable to get wet.  A variation of this, kinetic sand, has several of the same properties, but acts like wet sand that will not dry out.  Hydrophobic sand, whether the wet or dry type, will not mix with water.

History

The earliest reference to waterproof sand is in the 1915 book The Boy Mechanic Book 2 published by Popular Mechanics.  The Boy Mechanic states waterproof sand was invented by East Indian magicians.  The sand was made by mixing heated sand with melted wax.  The wax would repel water when the sand was exposed to water.  

Magic sand was originally developed to trap ocean oil spills near the shore.  This was done by sprinkling magic sand on floating petroleum, which would then mix with the oil and make it heavy enough to sink.  Due to the expense of production, however, it is no longer used for this purpose. 

Hydrophobic sand has also been tested by utility companies in Arctic regions as a foundation for junction boxes, as it never freezes.  It is also used as an aerating medium for potted plants.

Properties

Magic sand
The properties of Magic sand are achieved using ordinary beach sand, which contains tiny particles of pure silica, and exposing it to vapors of trimethylsilanol (CH3)3SiOH, an organosilicon compound.  Upon exposure, the trimethylsilanol compound bonds to the silica particles while forming water. The exteriors of the sand grains are thus coated with hydrophobic groups.  When Magic sand is removed from water, it is completely dry and free-flowing.

Aqua Sand, a brand name toy product made using magic sand, can be found in blue, green, or red colors; but all appear silvery in water because of a layer of air that forms around the sand.

Brands

Kinetic Sand
 A toy trademarked and produced by Spin Master Ltd.  Kinetic Sand looks like regular wet sand but is available in different colors.  It can be molded into any desired shape. It is 98% ultra-fine grain sand mixed with 2% dimethicone (polydimethylsiloxane), and coated with olive oil.  Because of its oil coating, the sand never dries out.  It mimics the physical properties of wet sand.
Aqua Sand
 Similar properties as above.

See also
 List of toys

References

External links
 Magic Sand Experiment from the American Chemical Society
 Video of how to make Magic Sand

Wham-O brands
Chemistry classroom experiments
Water toys
Educational toys
Construction toys
Sand
Sensory toys
Executive toys